Joseph C. Gilpin was a 19th-century American businessman and early railroad executive, based in Delaware.

Career
In 1832, he helped found the Wilmington Fire Insurance Company, along with James Canby, Edward Tatnall, Éleuthère Irénée du Pont, Jacob Pusey, William P. Brobson, James Price, and Edward W. Gilpin.

Between at least 1829 and 1835, Gilpin was a director of the Wilmington branch of the Farmers' Bank of Delaware.

In 1833, he was an officer of the Delaware Coal Company.

In 1838, Gilpin was a director of the Wilmington and Susquehanna Railroad, one of the four railroad companies that built the first rail link from Philadelphia, Pennsylvania, to Baltimore, Maryland. (The line is today part of Amtrak's Northeast Corridor.) His service as a railroad executive is noted on the 1839 Newkirk Viaduct Monument, located in Philadelphia.

Personal life
Gilpin married Lydia Nichols on January 1, 1825.

See also

 List of people associated with rail transport
 List of people from Wilmington, Delaware

Notes

Year of birth missing
Place of birth missing
Year of death missing
Place of death missing
19th-century American railroad executives
American bankers
American corporate directors
American businesspeople in insurance
American financial company founders
American businesspeople in the coal industry
Businesspeople from Delaware
Corporate executives
People from Wilmington, Delaware